What the Future Holds Pt. 2 is the  seventh studio album by the British group Steps. The album was released on 10 September 2021 by BMG Rights Management.

Background
In April 2021, Steps announced what was intended to be a deluxe edition of What the Future Holds would now be released as their seventh studio album, What the Future Holds Pt. 2. Claire Richards described the new record, "we see What the Future Holds Pt. 2 as the perfect companion piece to the original album. The new record is classic Steps but also explores some brand-new sounds."

Singles
The first single was confirmed as "Heartbreak in This City" remix featuring singer and television personality Michelle Visage. It debuted on BBC Radio 2 on 25 February, and made available to stream/download that same day. The single debuted at number 25 on the Official Singles Sales Chart.

"Take Me for a Ride" was released on 29 July 2021 as the album's second single.

A cover of "The Slightest Touch" was released on 20 August 2021 as the album's third single.

In November 2021 and during opening night of the arena tour, Lee Latchford-Evans confirmed "A Hundred Years of Winter" was the next single. It was released on 19 November 2021.

Commercial performance
What the Future Holds Pt. 2 debuted at number 2 in the UK Albums Charts with 20,000 units sold, only 4,000 copies behind Manic Street Preachers' The Ultra Vivid Lament. This was the second time the two groups competed for number-one position, after their albums This Is My Truth Tell Me Yours and Step One also charted at number 1 and 2, respectively, way back in 1998. This marks Steps' third consecutive number 2 studio album since their reunion in 2012, next to Tears on the Dancefloor and What the Future Holds Pt. 1.

In Australia, the album debuted at number 11, Steps' highest peak in the country in 23 years, since their debut album Step One peaked at number 5 in 1998.

Track listing

Charts

Release history

Notes

References

2021 albums
Steps (group) albums
Pop albums by British artists